The College Boyz was an American hip hop group and voice actors composed of R.O.M., Squeak, B. Selector and DJ Cue.

The group was signed to Virgin Records. Originally calling itself RMG, the group changed its name to College Boyz upon moving to Los Angeles.

They released their debut, Radio Fusion Radio, on April 7, 1992, through Virgin Records. The album was not a huge success, but it managed to make it to three different charts, peaking at #118 on the Billboard 200, #25 on the Top R&B/Hip-Hop Albums and #2 on the Top Heatseekers. Radio Fusion Radio also featured the hit single "Victim of the Ghetto", which peaked at #68 on the Billboard Hot 100 and #1 on the Hot Rap Singles.

On October 4, 1994, the group released their second and final album Nuttin' Less Nuttin' Mo'. It made it to #80 on the Top R&B/Hip-Hop Albums, and producing a single "Rollin" that reached #49 on the Hot Rap Singles. The College Boyz disbanded in 1994 with Romany "R.O.M." Malco eventually becoming a successful actor.

Discography

References

Hip hop groups from California
Musical groups from Los Angeles
Musical quartets
American male voice actors
Virgin Records artists
Musical groups established in 1991
Musical groups disestablished in 1994
1991 establishments in California